Folgoso is a surname. Notable people with the surname include:

Alfonso Falero Folgoso (born 1959), Spanish japanologist
Óscar Lozano Folgoso (born 1996), Spanish footballer